Falls Creek is a  long 2nd order tributary to the Deep River in Moore and Chatham Counties, North Carolina.

Course
Falls Creek rises in a pond about 1 mile northwest of Harpers Crossroads, North Carolina in Chatham County and then flows south to join the Deep River about 0.25 miles northwest of High Falls.

Watershed
Falls Creek drains  of area, receives about 47.7 in/year of precipitation, and has a wetness index of 411.24 and is about 53% forested.

See also
List of rivers of North Carolina

References

Rivers of North Carolina
Rivers of Chatham County, North Carolina
Rivers of Moore County, North Carolina